Beth Doherty is an Irish climate activist. A follower of fellow climate activist Greta Thunberg, Doherty is a member of Fridays for Future. Beginning at age 15, Doherty has raised awareness of efforts to fight climate change.

Climate activism
On 6 March 2019, as part of a group of invited students, Doherty addressed members of the Oireachtas Committee on Climate Action, prior to scheduled student protests in the following weeks, at which six demands for climate action were presented.  In March 2019, Doherty appeared on The Late Late Show alongside several other youth climate activists. During the 15 March school strike for climate in 2019, Doherty addressed a crowd of over 11,000 at the Dublin strike, in which she criticized the government for lack of action on climate change, and accused Minister for Climate Action and Environment Richard Bruton of using the rally as a photo op.

Doherty has written pieces for TheJournal.ie about the failure of the Irish government to meet its 2020 climate goals. Additionally, she has worked with Dublin City Council on the council's new climate plan. In April 2019, Doherty appeared at the ‘Loud & Clear! Youth views on Climate’ event at the European Parliament office with several MEP candidates in Dublin to speak in favour of better climate policy.
Doherty again addressed climate protesters in Dublin during a second strike on 24 May 2019.

In May 2019 Doherty addressed the national IDEA conference on the reasons for the strike movement. Doherty also worked as a head organiser for the third major school strike on 21 June 2019, along with the two other major strikes and a rally for the Irish declaration of a climate emergency on 4 May 2019. In August 2019, Doherty represented Ireland at the Fridays for Future European Summit in Lausanne, Switzerland, alongside 13 other participants.

In November 2019, Doherty was one of the 157 delegates to the RTE Youth Assembly on Climate in Dáil Éireann. Her proposal, regarding a tiered tax system on corporations' emissions, was voted onto the declaration of the Youth Assembly as one of the 10 proposals. She later presented the declaration to the President of the UN General Assembly, Tijani Muhammad-Bande, alongside the writers of the nine other proposals. Later that week, Doherty also met and delivered a speech in front of the President alongside the Irish UN Youth Delegates. Also in November, Doherty worked as an organiser of the Dublin strike on 29 November, in tandem with an internationally coordinated strike. From 2020-2021, Doherty was the Sustainability Officer of the Irish Second-Level Students' Union.

In addition to her efforts in climate activism, Doherty was a grand finalist in the National Matheson Junior Debating competition, and is a member of European Youth Parliament Ireland, and will represent Ireland at the postponed 92nd International Session of the European Youth Parliament that will take place in Milan.

References

2003 births
Irish women environmentalists
Politicians from Dublin (city)
Irish feminists
Living people